For information on all Southern Virginia University sports, see Southern Virginia Knights for football see Southern Virginia Knights football

The Southern Virginia Knights football team has had 6 head coaches since its first recorded football game in 2003.  The current coach is Edwin Mulitalo who first took the position for the 2018 season.

Key

Coaches

Notes

References

Lists of college football head coaches

Virginia sports-related lists